Mitirinchi Island (meaning "Soul Island" in Kuuku Ya'u, a sacred site) is a national park in the Great Barrier Reef Marine Park Queensland, Australia, 1,947 km (1,210 mi) northwest of Brisbane. It is situated about 30 km (19 mi) north-east of Kutini-Payamu National Park and Lockhart River in the Cape Weymouth area near Portland Roads.

Mitirinchi Island is closed to visitors due to its status as a significant seabird breeding site. It is one of only three recorded breeding sites in the northern Great Barrier Reef for great frigatebirds, and is also home to a large breeding colony of black noddies.

See also

 Protected areas of Queensland

References

Islands of Queensland
National parks of Far North Queensland
Protected areas established in 1989
1989 establishments in Australia
Coral Sea Islands